This is a list of Statutory Instruments made in the United Kingdom in the year 2016.

1-100

101-200

201-300

301-400

401-500

501 and above

References

Law of the United Kingdom
2016 in British law
2016 in British politics
Lists of Statutory Instruments of the United Kingdom